Nastagio degli Onesti is the protagonist in one of the one hundred short stories contained in The Decameron by Giovanni Boccaccio. The eighth story of the fifth day, it tells of the unrequited love of the nobleman Nastagio for a girl who will eventually be induced to accept Nastagio's affection by the appearance of a rejected lover and her beloved.

Plot 
Nastagio degli Onesti is a noble in Ravenna, made rich after the death of his father and uncle. He falls in love with a girl of a noble family, the daughter of Paul Traversari. To get her attention, Nastagio begins to squander his money on banquets and parties organized only for her (a reference to the economy that links this story to that of ); The girl, however, does not return the love of Nastagio; indeed she takes pleasure in refusing it. Nastagio tries to forget the noble girl. Failing this he starts to hate her. This drives him to attempt suicide several times with no success.

Seeing Nastagio's despair, his friends and relatives advise him to go to Ravenna, in order to forget his unfulfilled love. The young man, unable to continue ignoring this advice, moves to Classe, not far from his hometown.

One Friday in early May, Nastagio walks through a pine forest at dusk, where he sees a girl running naked in tears, being chased by two dogs trying to bite her and a Knight with a black sword intending to kill her. Nastagio tries to defend her, but the knight presents himself as Guido of Anastagi and tells of how he had once loved this woman, but because she did not love him, he had himself committed suicide. When the girl died without any regrets for the misery she had inflicted on her admirer, she was sentenced to the cruel punishment of being hunted. Every Friday, the girl would have to undergo the killing and subsequent restoration of their bodies for as many years as it had been months that she had rejected her wooer.

Nastagio understands the events to be of divine will and resigns himself to being an onlooker. He witnesses the agony inflicted on the young girl by the rider, after which the two are forced to start the chase again and disappear from Nastagio's sight. The young man decides to take advantage of the situation and prepares a lavish banquet in the same place of the forest on the following Friday, inviting the relatives of his beloved together with his parents. As Nastagio predicted, at the end of the dinner the horrifying scene is repeated with the same harrowing and pitiful consequences. With this he gets the desired effect: after the hunter once again explains the reasons for the girl's fate to all of those present at the dinner, the girl loved by Nastagio realizes she had stepped on the love felt by Nastagio and, for fear of suffering the same fate of the victim before her, she changes her mind and immediately agrees to the marriage, transforming his hate into love. So the Sunday after they marry, and all the women of Ravenna learn to be more kind to their love.

Art 
Sandro Botticelli made a series of four panels that illustrate many episodes of the story Boccaccio, thought to have been commissioned by Lorenzo the Magnificent in 1483 as a gift to Giannozzo Pucci at his marriage to Lucrezia Bini of that year. Originally stored in Palazzo Pucci, Florence, in the second half of the nineteenth century they were dispersed: three are now in the Prado, and only one, the last, has returned to its original location after being, among other things, in the Collection Watney of Charlbury at London.

Style and interpretations 
Two characters of the novel, the black knight and the woman on the run, are damned in hell. There has been no sign of repentance for their sins, and that is suicide for him and the refusal of love for her. By Boccaccio, then, love, even in its component hedonistic, receives a positive evaluation: everyone has the right to love and be loved in return, so the woman was guilty for not having loved.

Even the scene of the "infernal hunt", already present in Divine Comedy, the singing of Pietro della Vigna, is inserted by Boccaccio in a setting very different from natural to Dante, a  locus amoenus  in which assumes traits much less gruesome and more like those of a sacred representation.

In the novel appear many words belonging to the language of courtly love. The lady is arrogant, disdainful, and haughty, though in this case, these negative qualities are in the very structure of the story, as it will give women an example of how they should not behave. Eventually the lady is promoted for her sincere love, not for fear of punishment which would have incurred, and in the end she falls for Nastagio.

References 

Characters in The Decameron
Male characters in literature
Fictional nobility